The European qualification for the 2015 World Men's Handball Championship, in Qatar, was disputed in two rounds among the teams that did not qualify for the 2014 European Men's Handball Championship and the 12 teams that placed outside of the European Championship's top three (excluding Spain, which were qualified automatically for the World Championship as holders).

In the first round of qualification, 20 teams not participating at the European Championship were split into five groups; the group winners advanced to the second round, joining the 12 European finalists and Germany, which was given a bye to this round. These 18 teams then were paired to play a two-legged playoff tie to determine the nine remaining World Championship qualifiers from Europe.

Group stage
The draw was held on 27 June 2013. The group winners advanced to the playoff round.

Group 1

Group 2

Group 3

Group 4

Group 5

Play-off round
The draw was held on 26 January 2014 at 13:00 in Herning, Denmark. The draw saw 18 teams competing for nine places at the 2015 World Men's Handball Championship. The teams were placed in two pots and drawn together to form nine play-off pairs. After a two-legged tie the winner of each pair qualified to the final tournament. All seeded teams (Iceland, Poland, Sweden, Hungary, Russia, Macedonia, Austria, Belarus, Serbia) and three unseeded (e.g. Norway, Czech Republic and Montenegro) had qualified for the play-off round as 12 of the 2014 European Men's Handball Championship which are not qualified directly to the final tournament.

Matches

First leg

Second leg

Czech Republic won 48–44 on aggregate.

Austria won 56–54 on aggregate.

Poland won 54–52 on aggregate.

Russia won 63–44 on aggregate.

Sweden won 52–45 on aggregate.

Slovenia won 54–51 on aggregate.

Bosnia and Herzegovina won 62–61 on aggregate.

Belarus won 57–52 on aggregate.

Macedonia won 62–48 on aggregate.

References

External links
Euro Handball 

2013 in handball
2014 in handball
World Handball Championship tournaments
Qualification for handball competitions